The Ministry of Primary and Mass Education (abbreviated as MoPME) is the ministry responsible for Primary (Class I-VIII) 
and Mass (literacy) education in Bangladesh.  Secondary, vocational and tertiary educations is the responsibility of the Ministry of Education (Bangladesh) (MoED).

Organisation
 Bureau of Non-Formal Education
 The National Academy for Primary Education
 Directorate of Primary Education

Ministers 
 Current Minister of State : Md. Zakir Hossain

References

External links 
 

 
Education in Bangladesh
Bangladesh
Education